The Battle of Saipan was a battle of the Pacific campaign of World War II, fought on the island of Saipan in the Mariana Islands from 15 June to 9 July 1944 as part of Operation Forager. It has been referred to as the "Pacific D-Day" with the invasion fleet departing Pearl Harbor on 5 June 1944, the day before Operation Overlord in Europe was launched, and launching nine days after. The U.S. 2nd Marine Division, 4th Marine Division, and the Army's 27th Infantry Division, commanded by Lieutenant General Holland Smith, defeated the 43rd Infantry Division of the Imperial Japanese Army, commanded by Lieutenant General Yoshitsugu Saitō. The loss of Saipan, with the deaths of at least 29,000 troops and heavy civilian casualties, precipitated the resignation of Prime Minister of Japan Hideki Tōjō and left the Japanese archipelago within the range of United States Army Air Forces B-29 bombers.

Background
In the campaigns of 1943 and the first half of 1944, the Allies had captured the Solomon Islands, the Gilbert Islands, the Marshall Islands and the Papuan Peninsula of New Guinea. This left the Japanese holding the Philippines, the Caroline Islands, the Palau Islands, and the Mariana Islands.

The Mariana Islands had not been a key part of pre-war American planning (War Plans Orange and Rainbow) because the islands were well north of a direct sea route between Hawaii and the Philippines. At the time, naval air/sea/logistics ability were not envisioned as being able to support operations against a place so far from potential land-based support. But, by early 1943, Admiral Ernest King, Commander in Chief of the United States Fleet, had become increasingly convinced of the strategic location of the islands as a base for submarine operations and air facilities for Boeing B-29 Superfortress bombing of the Japanese home islands. From these latter bases, communications between the Japanese archipelago and Japanese forces to the south and west could be cut.

The capture of the Marianas was formally endorsed in the Cairo Conference of November 1943. The plan had the support of U.S. Army Air Force planners because the airfields on Saipan were large enough to support B-29 operations, within range of the Japanese home islands, and unlike a China-based alternative, was not open to Japanese counter-attacks once the islands were secure. However, General Douglas MacArthur strenuously objected to any plan that would delay his return to the Philippines. His objections were routed through formal channels as well as bypassing the Joint Chiefs of Staff, appealing directly to Secretary of War Henry Stimson and President Franklin D. Roosevelt.

MacArthur's objections were not without tactical reasoning based on the experience of the invasion of Tarawa (Operation Galvanic), but were voiced before the vastly improved experience in the Gilbert and Marshall Islands (Operation Flintlock - Kwajalein, Eniwetok and other islands/atolls), the increase in naval forces, the successful attack on Truk and the Carolines islands by carrier-based aircraft (Hailstone), and coordinated armed services experience gained by all these operations in Admiral Chester Nimitz’s Pacific Ocean Area of operations.

While not part of the original American plan, MacArthur, commander of the Southwest Pacific Area command, obtained authorization to advance through New Guinea and Morotai toward the Philippines. This allowed MacArthur to keep his personal pledge to liberate the Philippines, made in his "I shall return" speech, and also allowed the active use of the large forces built up in the southwest Pacific theatre. The Japanese, expecting an attack somewhere on their perimeter, thought an attack on the Caroline Islands most likely. To reinforce and supply their garrisons, they needed naval and air superiority, so Operation A-Go, a major carrier attack, was prepared for June 1944.

Opposing forces

United States
US Fifth Fleet
Admiral Raymond A. Spruance
 Northern Attack Force (Task Force 52)
 Vice Admiral Richmond Kelly Turner
 Expeditionary Troops (Task Force 56)
 Lieut. General Holland M. Smith, USMC
 Approx. 59,800 officers and enlisted
 V Amphibious Corps (Lt. Gen. Smith)
 2nd Marine Division (Maj. Gen. Thomas E. Watson, USMC)
 4th Marine Division (Maj. Gen. Harry Schmidt, USMC)
 27th Infantry Division (Army) (Maj. Gen. Ralph C. Smith, USA)

Japan
Central Pacific Area Fleet HQ
Vice Admiral Chūichi Nagumo
 Thirty-first Army
 Lieut. General Hideyoshi Obata
 Defenses of Saipan
 Lieut. General Yoshitsugu Saitō
 Approx. 25,500 army and 6,200 navy personnel
 43rd Division
 47th Independent Mixed Brigade
 Miscellaneous units

Battle

The following day, two naval bombardment groups led by Rear Admiral Jesse B. Oldendorf arrived on the shore of Saipan. This force was the main naval fire support for the seizure of the island and consisted of 7 older battleships, 11 cruisers, and 26 destroyers, along with destroyer transports and fast minesweepers. The old battleships, commissioned between 1915 and 1921, were trained in shore bombardment and were able to move into closer range. Four of them (and ) were survivors of the attack on Pearl Harbor.

The landings began at 07:00 on 15 June 1944. More than 300 LVTs landed 8,000 Marines on the west coast of Saipan by about 09:00. Eleven fire support ships covered the Marine landings. Careful artillery preparation — placing flags in the lagoon to indicate the range — allowed the Japanese to destroy about 20 amphibious tanks, and they had placed barbed wire, artillery, machine gun emplacements, and trenches to maximize the American casualties. The Japanese counter-attacked at night but were repelled with heavy losses. On 16 June, units of the U.S. Army's 27th Infantry Division landed and advanced on the airfield at Ås Lito. Again the Japanese counter-attacked at night. On 18 June, Saito abandoned the airfield.

The invasion surprised the Japanese high command, which had been expecting an attack further south. Admiral Shigetarō Shimada, Commander-in-Chief of the Imperial Japanese Navy (IJN), saw an opportunity to use the A-Go force to attack the U.S. Navy forces around Saipan. On 15 June, he gave the order to attack. But the resulting battle of the Philippine Sea was a disaster for the IJN, which lost three aircraft carriers and hundreds of planes.

Without resupply, the battle on Saipan was hopeless for the defenders, but the Japanese were determined to fight to the last man. Saitō organized his troops into a line anchored on Mount Tapochau in the defensible mountainous terrain of central Saipan. The nicknames given by the Americans to the features of the battle — "Hell's Pocket", "Purple Heart Ridge" and "Death Valley" — indicate the severity of the fighting. The Japanese used many caves in the volcanic landscape to delay the attackers, by hiding during the day and making sorties at night. The Americans gradually developed tactics for clearing the caves by using flamethrower teams supported by artillery and machine guns.

The operation was marred by inter-service controversy when Marine General Holland Smith, dissatisfied with the performance of the 27th Division, relieved its commander, Army Major General Ralph C. Smith. However, Holland Smith had not inspected the terrain over which the 27th was to advance. Essentially, it was a valley surrounded by hills and cliffs under Japanese control. The 27th took heavy casualties and eventually, under a plan developed by Ralph Smith and implemented after his relief, had one battalion hold the area while two other battalions successfully flanked the Japanese.

By 6 July, the Japanese had nowhere to retreat. Saitō made plans for a final suicidal banzai charge. On the fate of the remaining civilians on the island, Saito said, "There is no longer any distinction between civilians and troops. It would be better for them to join in the attack with bamboo spears than be captured." At dawn of 7 July, with a group of 12 men carrying a red flag in the lead, the remaining able-bodied troops — about 4,000 men — charged forward in the final attack. Behind them came the wounded, with bandaged heads, crutches, and barely armed. The Japanese surged over the American front lines, engaging both Army and Marine units. The 1st and 2nd Battalions of the 105th Infantry Regiment were almost destroyed, losing well over 650 killed and wounded. The two battalions fought back, as did the Headquarters Company, 105th Infantry, and supply elements of 3rd Battalion, 10th Marine Artillery Regiment, resulting in over 4,300 Japanese killed and over 400 dead US soldiers with more than 500 more wounded. For their actions during the 15-hour Japanese attack, three men of the 105th Infantry Regiment were awarded the Medal of Honor: Lt. Col. William O'Brien, Cpt. Ben L. Salomon, Pvt. Thomas A. Baker, all posthumously. The attack on 7 July would be the largest Japanese Banzai charge in the Pacific War.

By 16:15 on 9 July, Admiral Turner announced that Saipan was officially secured. Saitō, along with commanders Hirakushi and Igeta, committed suicide in a cave. Vice-admiral Chuichi Nagumo, the naval commander who led the Japanese carriers at Pearl Harbor, also committed suicide in the closing stages of the battle. He had been in command of the Japanese naval air forces stationed on the island.

In the end, almost the entire garrison of troops on the island — at least 29,000 — died. For the Americans, the victory was the most costly to date in the Pacific War: out of 71,000 who landed, 2,949 were killed and 10,464 wounded. Future Hollywood actor Lee Marvin was among the many Americans wounded. He was serving with "I" Company, 24th Marine Regiment, when he was hit by shrapnel in the buttocks by Japanese mortar fire during the assault on Mount Tapochau. He was awarded the Purple Heart and was given a medical discharge with the rank of private first class in 1945.

Gen. Smith and V Amphibious Corps anticipated that taking Saipan would be difficult and they wanted to have a mechanized flamethrowing capability. Research, development, and procurement made that a long-term prospect.  So VAC purchased 30 Canadian Ronson flamethrowers and requested that the Army's Chemical Warfare Service in Hawaii install them in M3 Stuarts, and termed them M3 Satans. Seabees with the CWS had 24 ready for the battle.

Further resistance
While the battle officially ended on 9 July, Japanese resistance still persisted with Captain Sakae Ōba and 46 other soldiers who survived with him during the last banzai charge. After the battle, Oba and his soldiers led many civilians throughout the jungle of the island to escape capture by the Americans, while also conducting guerrilla-style attacks on pursuing forces. The Americans tried numerous times to hunt them down but failed due to their speed and stealth. In September 1944, the Marines began conducting patrols in the island's interior, searching for survivors who were raiding their camp for supplies. Although some of the soldiers wanted to fight, Captain Ōba asserted that their primary concerns were to protect the civilians and to stay alive to continue the war. At one point, the Japanese soldiers and civilians were almost captured by the Americans as they hid in a clearing and ledges of a mountain, some were less than 20 feet (6.1 m) above the heads of the Marines, but the Americans failed to see them. Oba's holdout lasted for over a year (approximately 16 months) before finally surrendering on 1 December 1945, three months after the official surrender of Japan.

Oba's resistance was so successful that it caused the reassignment of a commander. U.S. Marines gave Oba the nickname "The Fox."

Civilian casualties
At least 25,000 Japanese civilians lived on Saipan at the time of the battle. Civilian shelters were located virtually everywhere on the island, with very little difference from military bunkers noticeable to attacking Marines. The standard method of clearing suspected bunkers was the use of high-explosive and/or high-explosives augmented with petroleum (e.g., gelignite, napalm, diesel fuel). The weapons used and the tactics of close quarter fighting resulted in high civilian casualties.

The U.S. erected a civilian prisoner encampment on 23 June 1944 that soon had more than 1,000 inmates. Electric lights at the camp were conspicuously left on overnight to attract other civilians with the promise of three warm meals and no risk of being shot in combat accidentally.

More than 1,000 Japanese civilians committed suicide in the last days of the battle to take the offered privileged place in the afterlife, some jumping from places later named "Suicide Cliff" and "Banzai Cliff". These would become part of the National Historic Landmark District as Landing Beaches; Aslito/Isley Field; & Marpi Point, Saipan Island, designated in 1985. Today the sites are a memorial and Japanese people visit to console the victims' souls.

Military awards
In addition to William O'Brien, Ben L. Salomon and Thomas A. Baker, Gunnery Sergeant Robert H. McCard and PFC Harold G. Epperson, were each posthumously awarded the Medal of Honor.

PFC Guy Gabaldon, of Headquarters and Service Company, 2nd Marine Regiment, 2nd Marine Division, was credited with capturing more than 1,000 Japanese prisoners during the battle. Gabaldon, who was raised by Japanese-Americans, used a combination of street Japanese and guile to convince soldiers and civilians alike that U.S. troops were not barbarians, and that they would be well treated upon surrender. For his outstanding bravery, which earned him the nickname, "The Pied Piper of Saipan," Gabaldon received a Silver Star, which was upgraded to the Navy Cross. During the war, his commanders had requested that he receive the Medal of Honor for his actions; however, his initial award was the Silver Star. In 1998, efforts were re-initiated to secure the Medal of Honor for Gabaldon. The effort was ongoing in 2006.

Aftermath
Holland Smith said: "It was the decisive battle of the Pacific offensive [...] it opened the way to the Japanese home islands." The victory would prove to be one of the most important strategic moments during the war in the Pacific Theater, as the Japanese archipelago was now within striking distance of United States' B-29 bombers. From this point on, Saipan would become the launch point for retaking other islands in the Mariana chain and the invasion of the Philippines in October 1944. Four months after capture, more than 100 B-29s from Saipan's Isely Field were regularly attacking the Philippines, the Ryukyu Islands and the Japanese mainland. In response, Japanese aircraft attacked Saipan and Tinian on several occasions between November 1944 and January 1945. The U.S. capture of Iwo Jima (19 February – 26 March 1945) ended further Japanese air attacks.

The loss of Saipan was a heavy blow to both the military and civilian administration of Prime Minister of Japan Hideki Tōjō. According to one Japanese admiral: "Our war was lost with the loss of Saipan." Shortly after Saipan was taken, a meeting at the Imperial General Headquarters was convened where it was decided that a symbolic change of leadership should be made: Tōjō would step aside and Emperor Hirohito would have less involvement in day-to-day military affairs, even though he was defined as both head of state and the Generalissimo of the Imperial Japanese Armed Forces according to the Meiji Constitution of 1889. The general staff believed it was now time to distance the Imperial House of Japan from blame as the tide of war turned against the Japanese. Although Tōjō agreed to resign, Emperor Hirohito blocked his resignation because he considered Tōjō to be Japan's strongest war leader. But after Tōjō failed to shuffle his Cabinet due to excessive internal hostility, he conceded defeat. On 18 July, Tōjō again submitted his resignation, this time unequivocally. His entire cabinet resigned with him. Former IJA General Kuniaki Koiso became Prime Minister on 22 July. However, due to the legacy of Saipan, Koiso was nothing more than a titular Prime Minister, and was prevented by the Imperial General Headquarters from participating in any military decisions.

Saipan also saw a change in the way Japanese war reporting was presented on the home front. Initially, as the battle started, Japanese accounts concentrated on the fighting spirit of the IJA and the heavy casualties it was inflicting on American forces. However, any reader familiar with Saipan's geography would have known from the chronology of engagements that the U.S. forces were relentlessly advancing northwards. No further mention of Saipan was made following the final battle on 7 July, which was not initially reported to the public. However, after Tōjō's resignation on 18 July, an accurate, almost day-by-day, account of the defeat on Saipan was published jointly by the Army and Navy. It mentioned the near total loss of all Japanese soldiers and civilians on the island and the use of "human bullets". The reports had a devastating effect on Japanese opinion; mass suicides were now seen as defeat, not evidence of an "Imperial Way". This was the first time Japanese forces had accurately been depicted in a battle since Midway, which had been proclaimed a victory.

On 16 July US forces began the bombardment of the nearby island of Tinian as a prelude to the successful Battle of Tinian (24 July-1 August).

Memorial
Suicide Cliff and Banzai Cliff, along with a number of surviving isolated Japanese fortifications, are recognized as historic sites on the U.S. National Register of Historic Places. The cliffs are also part of the National Historic Landmark District Landing Beaches; Aslito/Isley Field; & Marpi Point, Saipan Island, which also includes the American landing beaches, the B-29 runways of Isley Field, and the surviving Japanese infrastructure of the Aslito and Marpi Point airfields.

The American Memorial Park on Saipan commemorates the U.S. and Mariana veterans of the Mariana Islands campaign.

See also
Battle of Saipan order of battle
Maritime Heritage Trail – Battle of Saipan

Notes

References

Further reading

Books

 – Firsthand account of naval gunfire support by a crewmember of USS Maryland.

Web

Saipan – a 2nd Marine Division pamphlet describing certain expected features of the invasion and combat, including the presence of a large civilian population.
Breaching the Marianas: The Battle for Saipan (Marines in World War II Commemorative Series)
Banzai charge in Saipan: Gyokusai  Suicide for the Emperor?

SMU's Frank J. Davis World War II Photographs contain 129 images of Saipan, including 18 images depicting the surrender of the famous "hold-out" Japanese forces under the command of Captain Oba in December 1945

External links

Small Unit Actions: The Fight on Tanapag Plain; 27th Division 6 July 1944 

Battles and operations of World War II involving Japan
Saipan
History of the Northern Mariana Islands
June 1944 events
July 1944 events
Mass suicides
Saipan
Saipan
United States Army in World War II
United States Marine Corps in World War II
World War II operations and battles of the Pacific theatre